Eurema lisa, commonly known as the little yellow, little sulphur or  little sulfur, is a butterfly species of subfamily Coliadinae that occurs in Central America and the southern part of North America.

Description

The wingspan is between 32 and 44 mm, not to be confused with the sleepy orange that is large and orange not yellow. The dorsal view of the forewing has a broad dark margin and the hindwing's ventral view has two basal blacks spots.

Range and habitat
The little yellow lives as far south as Costa Rica north through southern portions of the United States, they can be seen throughout much more of the United States but this is due to seasonal colonization from the south. Within their range they can be seen in open areas, most commonly old fields.

Life cycle
In the southern part of its range there can be up to five broods per year, while in the northern range there are between one and three. During warm days males patrol for females so they can mate. Females lay eggs singly on the midveins of their host plant.

Larval foods
 Cassia fasciculata
 Cassia nicitans

Adult foods
The adults feed on the nectar of species in the genus Aster.

References

F. Martin Brown and Bernard Heineman, Jamaica and its Butterflies (E. W. Classey, London 1972), Plate VI

lisa
Butterflies of North America
Butterflies of Central America
Butterflies of the Caribbean
Pieridae of South America
Butterflies of Cuba
Butterflies of Jamaica